The Queen of Peace Cathedral  also called Regina Pacis Cathedral or Long Xuyên Cathedral is a religious building that is located in Long Xuyen, capital city of the province of An Giang in the Mekong Delta region in the southwest Asian country of Vietnam.

The cathedral follows the Roman or Latin rite and is the mother of the Diocese of Long Xuyên (Dioecesis Longxuyensis or  Giáo phận Long Xuyên) which was created in 1960 by bull "Christi mandata" of Pope John XXIII. It was formally consecrated in 1974.

It is under the pastoral responsibility of the Bishop Joseph Trần Xuân Tiếu. It stands a large statue dedicated to the Virgin Mary and a tower of 55 meters high.

See also
List of cathedrals in Vietnam
Roman Catholicism in Vietnam
Notre-Dame Cathedral Basilica of Saigon

References

Roman Catholic cathedrals in Vietnam
Long Xuyen
Roman Catholic churches completed in 1974
20th-century Roman Catholic church buildings in Vietnam